HYH may refer to:
 нун, the name for the letter H in the Arabic alphabet of the Kazakh language.
 Halyard Health, an American medical equipment manufacturer
 Hydra Head Records
 Hythe (Essex) railway station, in England